Cycling is an event at the Island Games, the biennial multi-sports event for island nations, territories and dependencies.

Cycling at the Island Games started in 1985 with Women competing from 1997.

The minimum age for competitors is 17 in the year of the event.
Each Island can enter up to 5 male and 3 female competitors per event

Recommended Programme: 
 Time Trial 
 Mountain Bike Criterium 
 Road Race
 Mountain Bike Cross Country 
 Road Criterium
Optional events may be possible

Events
Most cycling events are road cycling.

Top Medalists

Men's Individual

Men's Time Trial

Men's Town Centre Criterium

Men's Road Race

Men's team

Men's Time Trial Team Event

Men's Town Centre Criterium Team Event

Men's Road Race Team Event

Men's Mountain Bike

Men's Mountain Bike Cross Country

Men's Mountain Bike Cross Country Team Event

Men's Mountain Bike Criterium

Men's Mountain Bike Criterium Team Event

Women's Individual

Women's Time Trial

Women's Town Centre Criterium

Women's Road Race

Women's team

Women's Time Trial Team Event

Women's Town Centre Criterium Team Event

Women's Road Race Team Event

Women's Mountain Bike

Women's Mountain Bike Cross Country

Women's Mountain Bike Cross Country Team Event

Women's Mountain Bike Criterium

Women's Mountain Bike Criterium Team Event

References 

 
Sports at the Island Games
Cycling at multi-sport events